Lake Utopia is located in eastern Charlotte County, New Brunswick.

The southern shore of the lake is one kilometre northeast of the town of St. George. The lake is connected to the Magaguadavic River by the second deepest natural canal in the world. Lake Utopia is approximately 7 kilometres long and between 0.8 and 2.8 kilometres in width. The lake level varies throughout the year, as more or less water is allowed through a hydroelectric dam on the Magaguadavic River in St. George. The lake is surrounded by mixed Acadian forest and its shoreline has been traditionally dotted by both rustic camps and large summer homes however over the last decade an increase in year-round home development has occurred. The lake has six islands which are privately owned and situated with seasonal cottages. During the winter months, much of the lake completely freezes.

Lake Utopia is a popular eastern Charlotte County recreation destination among year-round residents and cottage-goers for swimming, boating and fishing. Fish in the lake include smallmouth bass, trout, perch and river eels.

On the western side of the lake is Canal Beach. Canal Beach is the major swimming destination on the lake's western shore. Its natural sand occupies a 0.5 kilometre stretch of shoreline. The beach/park is maintained and operated by the Town of St. George, and is open from the first weekend of June to weekend after Labour Day. Despite being a public beach, there is no lifeguard on duty. Canal Beach is equipped with a beach volleyball court, playground, seasonal canteen, washrooms and changing rooms. Immediately north of Canal Beach is the natural canal that connects the lake to the Magaguadavic River. Further north, still on the western shore of the lake, is Grey Mountain. Much of the northern area of the lake's western shore is untouched with only a few cottages.

On the northern shore of the lake was a smaller, less popular swimming location called "Scout's Beach" (also traditionally called "Frauley's Beach"). During the 1940s-1960s, a Scouts Canada camp was built on the north shore of the lake. The camp was later owned and maintained by Connors Bros. Ltd. After the decline of its operation, Scout's Beach became known locally as a "party spot" and was host to two or three large gatherings every summer during the 1970s-1980s. In the early 2000s, the land was sold by Connors Bros. Ltd. to a private developer and a number of homes were constructed, including a very large private estate. The beach area is now private, restricted to public use.

On the lake's eastern shore, near a spot locally known as "the Bluff", during the early 1900s, "Bryn Derwyn", a summer hotel which was later a summer camp for boys operated until it burned in June 1918. The boys camp continued through the 1920s. During the 1960s, local company Connors Bros. Ltd., who owned much of the eastern shore at that time, operated a public beach. The beach was a popular spot with concession stands and amusement rides. Much of the lake's eastern shore is developed with both cottages and year-round homes, and connected via Route 785.

Islands

Lake Utopia is home to six (6) islands. Situated north to south, the islands are:
 Duck Island
 Long Island
 Small Island
 Big Island
 Spruce Island
 Cannonball Island

All of the islands are privately owned and have seasonal cottages. Located in the southern part of the lake, "Cannonball Island" was used as bombing practice by the nearby former Pennfield Ridge Air Station during the Second World War. In addition to island, there are several rock ledges in the lake. A pair of ledges located in the central section of the lake, along the western shore, are called "The Butterballs". Another rock ledge is located approximately 330 meters to the west of Big Island. Depending upon the water level of the lake, this ledge may be submerged and be a hazard to boaters unfamiliar with navigating the lake.

Lake Monster

Local legend has it that the Lake is inhabited by a sea monster known as the "Lake Utopia Lake Monster". The story goes that long ago two Maliseet Natives were canoeing on the lake when suddenly the monster appeared and chased them from one end to the other. Since the arrival of Europeans to the area in the late 18th century, the story has continued, with new sightings being reported every three to five years.

As noted in research by cryptozoologist Loren Coleman, the locals have called this cryptid "Old Ned." It has a decidedly long and bulky cetacean appearance, and may be representative of an unknown group of animals that travel back and forth between Lake Utopia and the Atlantic Ocean in routine cycles related to breeding and feeding.

Sightings:

 1868—A Saint Croix Courier reporter says he and one other witness saw the monster.
 1872—Natives describe a terrifying monster with a large head and bloody jaws following their canoes.
 1891—William Francis Ganong records in his notebook a description of a monster provided by a lumberman who claimed to have seen it 20 years prior. "It was dark red in colour, the part showing above the water was 20 feet long and as big around as a small hogshead; it was much like a large eel."
 1969—The Saint John Evening Times Globe reports on an interview with Mrs. Fred McKillop Sr., who said she saw a huge creature 18 years earlier. "It looked like a huge black rock.... It moved up and down the lake, boiling and churning the water, making great waves."
 1982—Sherman Hatt says he and his family saw a large creature that looked like "a submarine coming out of the water with spray on both sides. It was about ten feet [3 metres] long and put me in mind of the back of a whale."
 1996—Roger and Lois Wilcox were canoeing on the lake when they saw ripples break the placid surface 100 metres away from them. It was heading toward Cannonball Island, a common monster sighting spot.

See also
List of lakes of New Brunswick
The Lake Utopia Preservation Association

References

Lakes of New Brunswick
Landforms of Charlotte County, New Brunswick
Tourist attractions in Charlotte County, New Brunswick